This is a list of electoral results for the electoral district of Grant in Victorian state elections.

Members for Grant

Election results

Elections in the 1960s

The two candidate preferred vote was not counted between the Labor and DLP candidates for Grant.

Elections in the 1950s

 Two party preferred vote was estimated.

Elections in the 1940s

Elections in the 1930s

Elections in the 1920s

 Two party preferred vote was estimated.

References

Victoria (Australia) state electoral results by district